Lee Kyung-kyu (born August 1, 1960) is a South Korean actor, comedian, MC, film producer, and screenwriter.

Lee patented his instant noodle recipe Kkokkomyeon, which he created during an amateur cooking contest in an episode of the variety show Qualifications of Men. It became one of the top-selling products of 2011, and changed the landscape of the domestic instant noodles' market.

Filmography

Film
 Born to Sing (2013) - producer, screenwriter, cameo
 White Tuft, the Little Beaver (2008) - Korean dubbing
 Highway Star (2007) - producer, cameo
 Aachi & Ssipak (animated, 2006) - voice cast
 A Bloody Battle for Revenge (1992) - director, screenwriter, lead actor
 Space Warrior, Fireman (1991) - lead actor
 Samtos and Dori with Braids (1989) - cast
 Super Hong Gil-dong (1988) - cast

Variety show

Awards and nominations

Listicles

References

External links
 
 

1960 births
Living people
People from Busan
South Korean comedians
Dongguk University alumni
South Korean Buddhists
Jeonju Yi clan